Clinton Rosemond (November 1, 1882 – March 10, 1966) was an American singer and actor. Born Cresent Clinton Rosemond, he served as a private in the United States Army during the Spanish–American War, and he later sang in the Southern Trio with John C. Payne and Mabel Mercer in the 1920s. The group was based in England and specialized in a cappella. Rosemond went on to act in American films of the 1930s and 1940s.

Often uncredited and typecast as a butler or servant due to a lack of film roles for African-American actors, he was frequently relegated to playing demeaning parts, such as a stereotypical "scared Negro". Rosemond died in 1966 from a stroke.

He and his wife Corinne had two daughters, Eleanor Alsobrooks, an educator, and Bertha Hope-Booker, a musician, and a son  Clinton, a city planner.

Partial filmography

 Only the Brave (1930) - The Butler (uncredited)
 The Mask of Fu Manchu (1932) - Slave (uncredited)
 No Man of Her Own (1932) - Porter (uncredited)
 Carolina (1934) - Singer (uncredited)
 Hearts in Bondage (1936) - Jordan's Servant (uncredited)
 The Green Pastures (1936) - Prophet
 Dark Manhattan (1937) - Ben Jones (uncredited)
 They Won't Forget (1937) - Tump Redwine
 Hollywood Hotel (1937) - Colored Man
 Accidents Will Happen (1938) - Man Getting Arm Broken (uncredited)
 The Toy Wife (1938) - Pompey
 Young Dr. Kildare (1938) - Conover (uncredited)
 Stand up and Fight (1939) - Enoch
 Calling Dr. Kildare (1939) - Conover
 Golden Boy (1939) - Chocolate Drop's Father (uncredited)
 Midnight Shadow (1939) - Mr. Dan Wilson
 Dark Command (1940) - Tom - McClouds' Servant (uncredited)
 Safari (1940) - Mike
 Maryland (1940) - Brother Dickey (uncredited)
 Santa Fe Trail (1940) - Black Man on Train (uncredited)
 Blossoms in the Dust (1941) - Zeke
 Belle Starr (1941) - Black Man on Bench (uncredited)
 Badlands of Dakota (1941) - Grayson's Butler (uncredited)
 The Vanishing Virginian (1942) - Black Minister (uncredited)
 Syncopation (1942) - Professor Topeka (uncredited)
 Yankee Doodle Dandy (1942) - White House Butler (uncredited)
 Are Husbands Necessary? (1942) - Enos
 Cabin in the Sky (1943) - Doctor (uncredited)
 I Walked with a Zombie (1943) - Coachman (uncredited)
 I Dood It (1943) - Actor in Play as Uncle Sig (uncredited)
 Is Everybody Happy? (1943) - Doorman (uncredited)
 Flesh and Fantasy (1943) - Elderly Man (uncredited)
 Heavenly Days (1944) - Servant (uncredited)
 Jungle Queen (1944, Serial) - Godac
 Voice of the Whistler (1945) - Train Porter (uncredited)
 Colonel Effingham's Raid (1946) - Servant (uncredited)
 Three Little Girls in Blue (1946) - Ben (uncredited)
 The Secret Heart (1946) - William (uncredited)
 The Homestretch (1947) - Black Man (uncredited)
 Sport of Kings (1947) - Josiah
 The Burning Cross (1947) - Grandpa West
 The Story of Seabiscuit (1949) - Swipe (uncredited)
 Tonight We Sing (1953) - Father (uncredited) (final film role)

References

External links

 Grave

1882 births
1966 deaths
Male actors from South Carolina
American male film actors
20th-century American male actors
African-American male actors
20th-century African-American people